The Office for Environmental Protection (OEP) is a proposed regulatory body for environmental protection in England "to provide independent oversight of the government's environmental progress".  It will be created as a statutory body by the Environment Bill.

As of July 2021 it exists as an interim body.  The first chair is Glenys Stacey, who has called delays in the passage of the bill "extremely disappointing". Its first chief executive is Natalie Prosser and its headquarters are in Worcester. Concerns have been raised about potential lack of powers, independence, funding and about freedom of information. The OEP is intended to replace the environmental protection functions of the EU, but a report by the Bingham Centre for the Rule of Law expressed concerns that the bill as of June 2021 would provide no equivalent legal remedy for breaches.

See also
Environmental Standards Scotland - the equivalent body in Scotland

References

Conservation in England
Department for Environment, Food and Rural Affairs
Non-departmental public bodies of the United Kingdom government